Atrypanius cretiger is a species of longhorn beetles of the subfamily Lamiinae. It was described by White in 1855, and is known from Mexico to Panama, and Colombia.

References

Beetles described in 1855
Acanthocinini